Twice 4th World Tour "III" (stylized in all caps), or simply, III (read as "three"), was the second worldwide concert tour and the fourth overall concert headlined by South Korean girl group Twice, in support of their third Korean studio album, Formula of Love: O+T<3 (2021). The tour began on December 25, 2021, at the Olympic Gymnastics Arena in Seoul, and concluded on May 15, 2022, at the Banc of California Stadium in Los Angeles, comprising 14 shows.

Background 
On October 1, 2021, an unnamed upcoming world tour was announced through the music video of "The Feels", the group's first English-language single. The name of the tour, Twice 4th World Tour "III", was revealed on November 15, with the initial 8 tour dates being announced on the same day. Additional concerts in Los Angeles and New York were added not long after due to overwhelming demand. On December 16, JYP Entertainment announced that the first concert in Seoul that was scheduled to take place on Christmas eve was canceled due to Covid-19 restrictions and venue operating hour restrictions.

The second concert in Seoul on December 26 was broadcast live on Beyond Live (V Live+). After the concert, two tour dates at Japan's Tokyo Dome were announced, making it Twice's second time performing at the stadium since their 2019 Japan Dome tour named "#Dream Day". A third tour date was announced on March 7. The concerts made them the first foreign female act to perform 3 consecutive nights at the stadium and the second female act to do so.

The arena North American leg of the tour wrapped up with an attendance of slightly over 100,000 attendees, making them the first girl group to achieve this attendance milestone on a North American leg of a concert tour. With the success of the tour, the 9-member group made history by announcing an encore stadium date in Los Angeles, with another being added shortly after the initial announcement. This makes Twice the first-ever K-pop girl group to hold stadium shows in North America, proving their global success.

Commercial performance

Set lists

Tour dates

Canceled shows

Notes

References 

2021 concert tours
2022 concert tours
Beyond Live
Concert tours of Asia
Concert tours of Japan
Concert tours of North America
Concert tours of South Korea
Concert tours of the United States